The 2010 FIBA U20 European Championship Division B was the 6th edition of the Division B of the European basketball championship for men's national under-20 teams. It was played from 14 to 24 July 2010 in Oberwart and Güssing, Austria.

Participating teams

  (16th place, 2009 FIBA Europe Under-20 Championship Division A)

  (15th place, 2009 FIBA Europe Under-20 Championship Division A)

First round
In the first round, the teams were drawn into four groups. The first three teams from each group advance to the quarterfinal round; the other teams will play in the 13th−17th place classification group.

Group A

Group B

Group C

Group D

Quarterfinal round
In this round, the teams play in two groups of six. The first two teams from each group advance to the semifinals; the third and fourth teams advance to the 5th–8th place playoffs; the other teams will play the 9th–12th place playoffs.

Group E

Group F

13th−17th place classification

Group G

9th−12th place playoffs

9th–12th place semifinals

11th place match

9th place match

5th−8th place playoffs

5th–8th place semifinals

7th place match

5th place match

Championship playoffs

Semifinals

3rd place match

Final

Final standings

See also
2010 FIBA Europe Under-20 Championship (Division A)

References

FIBA U20 European Championship Division B
FIBA Europe Under-20 Championship Division B
International youth basketball competitions hosted by Austria
July 2010 sports events in Europe
FIBA Europe U-20 Championship Division B
FIBA U20